The Yindjibarndi  are an Aboriginal Australian people of the Pilbara region of Western Australia. They form the majority of Aboriginal people around Roebourne (the Millstream area). Their traditional lands lie around the Fortescue River.

Language
Yindjibarndi, with around 1000 speakers has been called the most innovative descendant of then proto-Ngayarta language. It is mutually intelligible with Kurruma. Due to their displacement in the colonisation process which forced them into Roebourne, many speakers are Ngarluma people who have adopted Yindjibarndi. Their spatial concepts regarding landscape of do not translate with any equivalent conceptual extension into English.

Ecology
Traditionally, until the arrival of Europeans, the Yindjibarndi lived along the middle sector of the valley through which the Fortescue River runs, and the nearby uplands. Beginning in the 1860s pastoralists established cattle stations on their homeland, and the Yindjibarndi were herded into settlements. Today most of them are congregated in and around the traditional Ngarluma territory whose centre is Roebourne.

Native title
The mining magnate Andrew Forrest head of Fortescue Metals Group, which extracts ore at the Solomon iron ore hub on the Yindjibarndi's traditional land, waged a 14-year legal battle to assert the company's rights against the people's aspirations to have native title.

Yindjibardni people, alongside the Ngarluma people, are also a party to the land access agreement for the Woodside-operated North West Shelf Gas Project, executed in 1998. Under the agreement, Ngarluma and Yindjibarndi people remain the traditional owner representatives for the North West Shelf Project area, which includes the Karratha Gas Plant.

The 1998 agreement established the Ngarluma Yindjibarndi Foundation Ltd (NYFL). NYFL continues to operate out of Roebourne. NYFL delivers social and economic benefits for the Ngarluma and Yindjibarndi people, and the broader Roebourne community. 

According to the Australian Broadcasting Corporation (ABC):

Notes

Citations

Sources

Aboriginal peoples of Western Australia
Pilbara